The Fayette County Courthouse is a historic courthouse building located at 110 East Court Street in Washington Court House, Ohio. On July 2, 1973, it was added to the National Register.

History
The area that is currently Fayette County was once part of the Virginia Military District and was established as a county in 1810 from part of Ross County. The county seat was placed at Bloomingburg and court was held in the home of John Devault. The county seat was moved to Washington Court House in 1812 and a wooden structure was built that year. This building was replaced by a brick structure in 1813, and ultimately burned downed in 1828.

This was soon deemed too small and a new courthouse was designed by architect David W. Gibbs and began construction in 1882. The courthouse closely resembles the county courthouse in Marion. The courthouse was completed in 1885 and has served the county since.

Exterior
The Second Empire style building rises three-stories on its square foundation. The ground floor consists of smooth stone blocks and rectangular windows. The building contains central projections with smooth stone blocks on all faces with a flight of stairs accessing the entrances. The entrances are set into a recessed arched alcove with two long arched windows on the fronts. Above the alcove is a small balcony topped by a pediment, which is supported by four Ionic columns. The pediment contains a tympanum decorated with a wreath surrounded by flags. A balustrade lines the balcony.  The second floor contains arched windows set into rusticated stone blocks. Decorative carved wreaths are set between each window. The third floor is lined with smooth stones and is pierced by long rectangular windows topped by a small square window above. A decorative frieze runs along this floor between the windows and Corinthian pilasters frame each window. The roof is supported by an entablature with dentil moldings and a balustrade lines the flat roof. A central tower rises on a solid bricked drum, the drum supports an arched and pillared bell tower. The bell tower is topped by a four faced clock which supports a dome rising to a statue.

References

Further reading
Thrane, Susan W.; County Courthouses of Ohio, Indiana University Press; Indianapolis, Indiana 2000 
Marzulli, Lawrence J.; The Development of Ohio's Counties and Their Historic Courthouses; Gray Printing Company; Fostoria, Ohio 1983
Stebbins, Clair; Ohio's Court Houses; Ohio State Bar Association; Columbus, Ohio 1980

External links
National Register listings for Fayette County
Ohio Supreme Court article

Courthouses on the National Register of Historic Places in Ohio
Buildings and structures in Fayette County, Ohio
County courthouses in Ohio
Government buildings completed in 1885
Clock towers in Ohio
Washington Court House, Ohio
U.S. Route 22
U.S. Route 62
National Register of Historic Places in Fayette County, Ohio
1885 establishments in Ohio